Tallimarjon ( or Talimarjon) is a town in Qashqadaryo Region, Uzbekistan. It is part of Nishon District. The town population was 6715 people in 1989, and 10,800 in 2016.

References

Populated places in Qashqadaryo Region
Cities in Uzbekistan